"Cursed Sleep" is a Bonnie 'Prince' Billy single taken from the 2006 album The Letting Go. The single comes in both 12" vinyl and CD formats.

Track listing
"Cursed Sleep"
"The Signifying Wolf"
"God's Small Song"

External links
[ Review] by Allmusic

2006 singles
Will Oldham songs
2006 songs
Drag City (record label) singles